Suzanne Hoschedé (April 29, 1868–February 6, 1899) was the eldest daughter of Alice Hoschedé and Ernest Hoschedé, the stepdaughter and favorite model of French impressionist painter Claude Monet, and wife of American impressionist painter Theodore Earl Butler. Suzanne is known as The Woman with a Parasol in Monet's painting of 1886.

Early life
In 1878 Monet and his family temporarily moved into the home of Ernest Hoschedé (1837–1891), a wealthy department store owner and patron of the arts. Both families then shared a house in Vétheuil during the summer. Hoschedé became bankrupt, and left in 1878 for Belgium. After the death of Monet's wife Camille in September 1879, and while Monet continued to live in the house in Vétheuil, Hoschedé's wife Alice (1844–1911) helped Monet to raise his two sons, Jean and Michel, by taking them to Paris to live alongside her own six children. They were Blanche Hoschedé Monet (who eventually married Jean Monet); Germaine; Suzanne Hoschedé; Marthe; Jean-Pierre; and Jacques. In the spring of 1880, Alice Hoschedé and all the children left Paris and rejoined Monet, still living in the house in Vétheuil.  In 1881, all of them moved to Poissy, which Monet hated. In April 1883, looking out the window of the little train between Vernon and Gasny, he discovered Giverny. They next moved to Vernon, then to a house in Giverny, Eure, in Upper Normandy, where he planted a large garden and where he painted for much of the rest of his life. Following the death of her estranged husband in 1891, Alice Hoschedé married Claude Monet in 1892 on July 16. The witnesses were the painters Gustave Caillebotte and Paul César Helleu.

Marriage

Despite Claude Monet’s initial objections to his stepdaughter Suzanne Hoschedé's marriage to American painter Theodore Earl Butler (1861–1936), he relented after discovering the wealth of Butler’s family. The marriage occurred a few days after Monet’s wedding. Theodore Earl Butler married Suzanne Hoschedé on 20 July 1892.

The event was immortalized in a painting by Theodore Robinson titled The Wedding March. They had a son Jimmy Butler, born in 1893, and daughter Lilly Butler, who was born the following year.

Death
After a lingering illness, Suzanne Hoschedé died on September 6, 1899. Marthe Hoschedé, Suzanne’s youngest sister, helped Butler raise Jimmy and Lilly.

Notes

References 

1860s births
1899 deaths
People from Eure
Claude Monet
French artists' models